Bruce Cameron (1955 – October 16, 1999) was an American guitarist who managed to attract a number of famous rock-and-roll musicians to record his 1999 debut and only album, Midnight Daydream, released by Brain Cell Records (North Carolina).

The unlikely cast of supporting musicians for this album included:
Jack Bruce (Cream, B.L.T., and solo career).
Mitch Mitchell (Jimi Hendrix Experience, Gypsy Sun and Rainbows, and Ramatam).
Buddy Miles (Band of Gypsys, Electric Flag, Buddy Miles Express).
Ken Hensley (Uriah Heep, Blackfoot).
Harvey Dalton Arnold (Outlaws).
Neal Smith (Alice Cooper).
Michael Bruce (Alice Cooper).
Bunk Gardner (The Mothers of Invention).
Billy James (Ant-Bee).
Billy Cox (Band of Gypsys, Gypsy Sun and Rainbows).

The entire album was recorded and engineered by Derrick Acker of Quetzal Recording and Bruce Cameron at his own home studio in North Carolina. The album was self-funded and promoted based on the quality of the website, advertisements and production quality. Funds were available due to Cameron's family wealth, allowing him to bring together talent and production for his dream project.

A press conference concerning the release was held at the Hilton Hotel in Wilmington, North Carolina, on September 15, 1999. Those present included Buddy Miles, Billy Cox, Cameron, and Cameron collaborator Billy James. Publicity material touted the group of musicians as a reunion of the Hendrix band, the Band of Gypsys, on the then Cameron-run website. Full page advertisements promoting the album had been run in a nationally distributed guitar magazine.

Within a month of the press conference, Cameron committed suicide, ending a short high-profile career of recording. The album has been under-represented to the public by its artists, who have tended not to list them in any public forums (with a couple of exceptions). The record is notable due to the involvement of so many Jimi Hendrix alumni players along with bassist Jack Bruce, and two of the five founding members of Alice Cooper, including the songwriter of most of Alice Cooper's biggest hits Michael Bruce.

Discography
Midnight Daydream, 1999

References

1955 births
1999 deaths
American rock guitarists
American male guitarists
20th-century American guitarists
20th-century American male musicians